Group A of the 1999 FIFA Confederations Cup took place from 25 to 29 July 1999 in Mexico City's Estadio Azteca. The group consisted of Bolivia, Egypt, host nation Mexico, and Saudi Arabia.

Teams

Notes

Standings

In the semi-finals:
 The winners of Group A, Mexico, advanced to play the runners-up of Group B, United States.
 The runners-up of Group A, Saudi Arabia, advanced to play the winners of Group B, Brazil.

Results

Bolivia vs Egypt

Mexico vs Saudi Arabia

Saudi Arabia vs Bolivia

Mexico vs Egypt

Egypt vs Saudi Arabia

Bolivia vs Mexico

References

A
1999–2000 in Saudi Arabian football
1999 in Bolivian football
1999–2000 in Egyptian football
1999–2000 in Mexican football